Attrition, also known as Final Mission, is a 2018 American Wing Chun film directed by Mathieu Weschler and produced by Saradan Media based on a screenplay by Steven Seagal. Starring Seagal, Siu-Wong Fan, and Yu Kang, the film revolves around an ex-special forces operative who comes out of retirement to rescue a Thai girl. Attrition was released direct-to-DVD on September 24, 2018.

Plot
Haunted by his violent past as a special forces operative, Axe (Steven Seagal) emigrates to Thailand and converts to Buddhism. Ensconced in a village as an acupuncturist and martial arts practitioner, Axe is one day approached by a Mr Yuen (Sonny Chatwiriyachai); Yuen pleads with him to rescue his eldest daughter, Tara (Ting Sue), who has been kidnapped by a trafficking ring led by QMom (Yu Kang). Axe eventually agrees to the job and puts together a team comprising businessman Chen Man (Siu-Wong Fan) and fellow ex-operatives Yinying (Kat Ingkarat), Infidel (Rudy Youngblood), Hollywood (Sergey Badyuk), and Scarecrow (James P. Bennett). At a medical hall in Mong La, Axe is confronted by QMom's righthand man, Black Claw Ma, but swiftly knocks him out. Thereafter, Axe's team raid QMom's nightclub and Chen Man finishes off Black Claw by killing him in an axe and broadsword fight. Axe rescues Tara and kills QMom with a broadsword. The film ends with Axe delivering a soliloquy on the erosion of traditional values and the corruption of Asian martial arts.

Cast

Release
Originally titled Final Mission, Attrition was released on Blu-ray and DVD on September 24, 2018. A reviewer for ManlyMovie.net praised the direction and Seagal's acting, hailing it as "Seagal’s best movie since Exit Wounds"; however, he was critical of the film's special effects, writing that the CGI blood was "the worst I’ve ever seen actually, almost like it may have even been done using over the counter software like Adobe After Effects."

References

External links
 

2018 films
2018 martial arts films
American martial arts films
American action films
2010s English-language films
2010s American films
2018 action films